Helonoma is a genus of flowering plants from the orchid family, Orchidaceae. It includes 4 known species, all native to South America.

Helonoma americana (C.Schweinf. & Garay) Garay - Venezuela, Ecuador
Helonoma bifida (Ridl.) Garay - Venezuela, Guyana, Brazil
Helonoma chiropterae (Szlach.) Carnevali & G.A.Romero in G.A.Romero & G.Carnevali - Venezuela
Helonoma peruviana (Szlach.) Salazar, H.C.Dueñas & Fern.Alonso - Colombia, Peru

See also 
 List of Orchidaceae genera

References 

 Pridgeon, A.M., Cribb, P.J., Chase, M.A. & Rasmussen, F. eds. (1999). Genera Orchidacearum 1. Oxford Univ. Press.
 Pridgeon, A.M., Cribb, P.J., Chase, M.A. & Rasmussen, F. eds. (2001). Genera Orchidacearum 2. Oxford Univ. Press.
 Pridgeon, A.M., Cribb, P.J., Chase, M.A. & Rasmussen, F. eds. (2003). Genera Orchidacearum 3. Oxford Univ. Press
 Berg Pana, H. 2005. Handbuch der Orchideen-Namen. Dictionary of Orchid Names. Dizionario dei nomi delle orchidee. Ulmer, Stuttgart

External links 

Orchids of South America
Cranichideae genera
Spiranthinae